Ericodesma is a genus of moths belonging to the subfamily Tortricinae of the family Tortricidae.

Species
Ericodesma adoxodes (Turner, 1939)
Ericodesma aerodana (Meyrick, 1881)
Ericodesma antilecta (Turner, 1939)
Ericodesma argentosa (Philpott, 1924)
Ericodesma concordana (Meyrick, 1881)
Ericodesma cuneata (Clarke, 1926)
Ericodesma indigestana (Meyrick, 1881)
Ericodesma isochroa (Meyrick, 1910)
Ericodesma leptosticha (Turner, 1916)
Ericodesma liquidana (Meyrick, 1881)
Ericodesma melanosperma (Meyrick, 1916)
Ericodesma pallida (Turner, 1945)
Ericodesma scruposa (Philpott, 1924)
Ericodesma spodophanes (Turner, 1945)

See also
List of Tortricidae genera

References

External links
tortricidae.com

Archipini
Tortricidae genera